Bayside High School is a public high school located in Virginia Beach, Virginia. It is in Virginia Beach City Public Schools.

The school is one of several magnet programs in Virginia Beach. Its feature is the Health Sciences Academy; students throughout the city interested in a health sciences education can apply. The school has a written agreement with Eastern Virginia Medical School regarding preferential admissions for Academy graduates.

Bayside is in the top three in Standards of Learning (SOL) scores within the school district. Bayside High has also achieved the highest End of Course SOL Algebra II and World History I pass rates among all schools in the district.

Notable alumni 

 Kenneth S. Reightler, Jr. (1969) – NASA astronaut 
 Derrick Gardner (1983) – jazz trumpeter
 Charles Clark (2006) – sprinter
 EJ Manuel (2008) – Florida State and Buffalo Bills quarterback
 Taquan Mizzell (2013) – Chicago Bears wide receiver
 Quin Blanding (2014) – Carolina Panthers safety

Clubs and organizations 

Athletic Training
Art Club
Asian American Association
AVID
Band
Bayside Book Club
Bayside Minority Achievement (BMAC)
Chess
Color Guard
Debate
DECA
Drama/International Thesipan Society
FCCLA
Freshman Class
Forensics
Future Business Leaders of America
Future Educators of America
Guitar Club
Gay Straight Alliance
Health Occupations Students Of America (HOSA)
Indian Cultural Association
Interact Club
Junior Class
Literary Magazine
Marlin TV Club
Medical Honor Society
Mental Health Awareness Club
National Honor Society
Newspaper
Nobleteens
Operation Smile
Orchestra
Scholastic Bowl
Senior Class
Sophomore Class
Student Cooperative Association (SCA)
Tri-M Music Honor Society
World Languages Club
Worldwide Awareness Club
Yearbook
Young Life

Sports

Fall
Cheerleading
Boys Cross Country
Girls Cross Country
Field Hockey
Football
Golf
Boys Volleyball
Girls Volleyball

Winter
Cheerleading
Boys Basketball
Girls Basketball
Gymnastics
Boys Indoor Track
Girls Indoor Track
Boys Swimming
Girls Swimming
Wrestling

Spring
Baseball
Boys Outdoor Track
Girls Outdoor track
Boys Soccer
Girls Soccer
Softball
Boys Tennis
Girls Tennis

State championships
1974 Forensics
1975 Forensics
1976 Forensics
1976 Baseball
1977 Softball
1978 Boys Indoor Track
1979 Softball
1980 Forensics
1981 Forensics
1981 Softball
1987 Boys Indoor Track
1988 Forensics
1990 Basketball
1991 Basketball
1995 Girls Outdoor Track
2000 Forensics
2006 Boys Outdoor Track

References

https://web.archive.org/web/20151119200132/http://www.vbschools.com/school_data/report_cards/1415/high/AnnualSchoolReportCard-BaysideHS.pdf

External links
 Virginia Beach City Public Schools
 Bayside HS official site

Educational institutions established in 1964
Bayside High School
High schools in Virginia Beach, Virginia
Public high schools in Virginia
1964 establishments in Virginia